The Bloc Québécois Shadow Cabinet of the 39th Canadian parliament is listed below.  Its composition was announced on February 15, 2006. Modifications were made on September 12, 2006.

See also
Cabinet of Canada
Official Opposition (Canada)
Shadow Cabinet
Official Opposition Shadow Cabinet (Canada)
New Democratic Party Shadow Cabinet

39th Canadian Parliament
Bloc Québécois Shadow Cabinets